Howl is the third studio album by American rock band Black Rebel Motorcycle Club. It was released on August 22, 2005 in the UK, August 23 in the US, and September 21 in Japan. The record was released in the UK and Europe by The Echo Label and by RCA in the US, Australia, Japan, and the rest of the world.

Critical reception

Many critics noted that Howl took a different direction from earlier BRMC releases. Critics were generally polarised with the album. While most agreed that their 2001 debut was the better of the first two records, and the follow-up had been rushed and lacklustre, opinion of the third offering was not so unified. Many critics saw the album as an innovative departure from the band's homeground, and the record that affirmed them as the "Kings of Cool" once again, while others professed the record dull, and a last-minute attempt at restoring a flagging career by an album of acoustic tracks that should have ended up as b-sides.

The title of the record is a direct reference to Allen Ginsberg's poem "Howl".

In an August 2018 issue of NME dedicated to great "lost" or "cult" albums, Howl was selected by Guy Garvey of the band Elbow as his favorite "lost" album.

Singles
Black Rebel Motorcycle Club had claimed that they signed to The Echo Label in order to release more singles from their albums, having only been allowed to release two from their previous album, Take Them On, On Your Own. Despite this, their first single from Howl, album opener "Shuffle Your Feet", was a download-only single, therefore (at the time) not eligible to chart. Following this, they released "Ain't No Easy Way", the most recognizable and popular song from the record. Noticeably after this, the proposed third single from the album, "Weight of the World", never materialized, with only a limited number of copies surfacing, again non-chart eligible.

Track listing

The Howl sessions EP
An additional six-song EP was released in 2006 featuring unreleased tracks from the Howl sessions:

 "Grind My Bones"
 "Mercy"
 "Wishing Well"
 "Steal a Ride"
 "Feel It Now"
 "Pretend"

Chart performance

References

2005 albums
Black Rebel Motorcycle Club albums